Big Island is a small, uninhabited island located in James Bay near the community of Chisasibi, Quebec, Canada. The island, one of three named "Big Island" in the Qikiqtaaluk Region of Nunavut, is part of the Arctic Archipelago.

References

External links 
 Big Island in the Atlas of Canada - Toporama; Natural Resources Canada

Islands of James Bay
Uninhabited islands of Qikiqtaaluk Region